Qara Kand (also Romanized as Qarā Kand; also known as Qarah Kand) is a village in Chaharduli Rural District, in the Central District of Asadabad County, Hamadan Province, Iran. At the 2006 census, its population was 127, in 28 families.

References 

Populated places in Asadabad County